Rail transport in Tanzania is conducted by two companies (Tanzania Railways Corporation and TAZARA). It has historically used narrow gauge trackage, but planning and construction of new standard gauge lines is underway as of 2017.

Railway links with adjacent countries 
  Burundi - no - proposed 
  DR Congo - decades ago there was a train ferry between Kigoma and Kalemie, in 2007 there are no ferry links and the DR Congo line to Kalemie is defunct because of a collapsed bridge. Break of gauge: /
  Kenya - yes -  same gauge, but the link between Moshi and Voi has not been operated for many years.
  Malawi - no - break of gauge /
  Mozambique - no - break of gauge /
  Rwanda - no - proposed  
  Uganda - yes - same gauge - via  train ferry from Mwanza to Port Bell or Jinja.
  Zambia - yes - break of gauge /

The central line between Kigoma and Dar es Salaam carries international freight and passengers in transit from Burundi, DR Congo and Rwanda to the Indian Ocean, and the branch from Tabora to Mwanza carries freight and passengers between Uganda and the Indian Ocean.
→

Standard gauge development

On 31 March 2015 the Tanzanian government announced it would use $14.2 billion of commercial loans to build new rail infrastructure across the country before 2021, and make the country a regional transport hub. In June, China Railway Materials was awarded a $7.6 billion contract, primarily funded by commercial financing, to build new standard gauge lines connecting Dar es Salaam with Burundi and Rwanda.  A separate $1.4 billion contract was awarded to China Railway Engineering Corporation to build a line between mines near Ludewa and the port of Mtwara. Both Chinese contracts were terminated by President John Magufuli when he took office in November 2015.

In February 2017, construction companies Yapı Merkezi and Mota-Engil were jointly awarded a contract to build  of track between Dar es Salaam and Morogoro, and a  line connecting Isaka with Burundi and Rwanda. Construction of the Dar es Salaam–Morogoro line began in April, with service expected to begin in 2019. Tanzania plans to extend the line to Dodoma, and later to Kigoma and Mwanza, contingent on obtaining financing. The first phase (Dar es Salaam–Morogoro Section) has been completed in April 2022.

Proposed line 
 Lobito-Dar es Salaam Railway

Maps 
 UN map
 Interactive map of Tanzania railways

See also 
 
 East African Railway Master Plan
 History of rail transport in Tanzania
 Tanzania
 Transport in Tanzania
 AIHSRN

References

Notes

Further reading

External links

 Tansania railway stations